Gilles Baril may refer to:

Gilles Baril (PQ) (born 1957), Canadian businessman, journalist and former politician
Gilles Baril (Liberal) (born 1940), Canadian politician